Phacelia campanularia is a species of flowering plant in the borage family, Boraginaceae, known by the common names desertbells, desert bluebells, California-bluebell, desert scorpionweed, and desert Canterbury bells. Its true native range is within the borders of California, in the Mojave and Sonoran Deserts, but it is commonly cultivated as an ornamental plant and it can be found growing elsewhere as an introduced species.

Description
This annual herb has an erect stem reaching  in maximum height. It is covered in glandular hairs. The leaf blades are somewhat rounded with toothed edges. The inflorescence is a loose cyme of flowers. The flower has a bright blue corolla up to 4 centimeters long which can be bell-shaped, funnel-shaped, or round and flattened. It can have white spots in the throat. The protruding stamens and style can be 4.5 centimeters long. The fruit is a capsule up to 1.5 centimeters long. It grows in dry, sandy places below .

Taxonomy
Two subtaxa are usually recognized, called subspecies or varieties. They can intergrade in some areas.
Phacelia campanularia ssp. campanularia – limited to the Sonoran Desert
Phacelia campanularia ssp. vasiformis – more common, with a wider range, and sometimes with larger flowers

Chemistry
The anthocyanin pigment phacelianin was isolated from the flowers of this species and is involved in the formation of their blue color. It is also responsible for the blue of the flowers of Evolvulus pilosus.

The juice, sap, or hairs may cause irritation or a skin rash and should be washed from skin as soon as possible.

Gallery

References

External links
CalPhotos

campanularia
Flora of the California desert regions
Flora of the Sonoran Deserts
Flora of Arizona
Natural history of the Mojave Desert
Garden plants of North America